2011 was the 19th year in the history of Pancrase, a mixed martial arts promotion based in Japan. 15 events were held, beginning with Pancrase: Gate 7th Chance.

Title fights

Events list

Pancrase: Gate 7th Chance

Pancrase: Gate 7th Chance was an event held on January 30, 2011, at The Gold's Gym South Tokyo Annex in Tokyo, Japan.

Results

Pancrase: Impressive Tour 1

Pancrase: Impressive Tour 1 was an event held on February 6, 2011, at The Differ Ariake Arena in Tokyo, Japan.

Results

Pancrase: Impressive Tour 2

Pancrase: Impressive Tour 2 was an event held on March 13, 2011, at The Azalea Taisho Hall in Osaka, Osaka, Japan.

Results

Pancrase: Impressive Tour 3

Pancrase: Impressive Tour 3 was an event held on April 3, 2011, at The Differ Ariake Arena in Tokyo, Japan.

Results

Pancrase: Impressive Tour 4

Pancrase: Impressive Tour 4 was an event held on May 3, 2011, at The Differ Ariake Arena in Tokyo, Japan.

Results

Pancrase: Impressive Tour 5

Pancrase: Impressive Tour 5 was an event held on June 5, 2011, at The Differ Ariake Arena in Tokyo, Japan.

Results

Pancrase: Gate 8th Chance

Pancrase: Gate 8th Chance was an event held on July 10, 2011, at The Gold's Gym South Tokyo Annex in Tokyo, Japan.

Results

Pancrase: Impressive Tour 6

Pancrase: Impressive Tour 6 was an event held on July 23, 2011, at The Shinjuku Face in Tokyo, Japan.

Results

Pancrase: Impressive Tour 7

Pancrase: Impressive Tour 7 was an event held on July 31, 2011, at The Azalea Taisho Hall in Osaka, Osaka, Japan.

Results

Pancrase: Impressive Tour 8

Pancrase: Impressive Tour 8 was an event held on August 7, 2011, at The Differ Ariake Arena in Tokyo, Japan.

Results

Pancrase: Impressive Tour 9

Pancrase: Impressive Tour 9 was an event held on September 4, 2011, at The Differ Ariake Arena in Tokyo, Japan.

Results

Pancrase: Impressive Tour 10

Pancrase: Impressive Tour 10 was an event held on October 2, 2011, at The Differ Ariake Arena in Tokyo, Japan.

Results

Pancrase: Impressive Tour 11

Pancrase: Impressive Tour 11 was an event held on November 12, 2011, at Shinjuku Face in Tokyo, Japan.

Results

Pancrase: Impressive Tour 12

Pancrase: Impressive Tour 12 was an event held on November 27, 2011, at Azalea Taisho Hall in Osaka, Osaka, Japan.

Results

Pancrase: Impressive Tour 13

Pancrase: Impressive Tour 13 was an event held on December 3, 2011, at Differ Ariake Arena in Tokyo, Japan.

Results

See also 
 List of Pancrase champions
 List of Pancrase events

References

Pancrase events
2011 in mixed martial arts